Masihuddin Ahmad, also known as Raja Miah, was a Member of the 3rd National Assembly of Pakistan as a representative of East Pakistan.

Career
Ahmad was a Member of the  3rd National Assembly of Pakistan representing Dhaka-II (present Manikganj).

References

Pakistani MNAs 1962–1965
Living people
Year of birth missing (living people)